John Tresse is a Norwegian handball player and coach.

He made his debut on the Norwegian national team in 1953, 
and played 12 matches for the national team between 1953 and 1960. He participated at the 1958 World Men's Handball Championship.

Tresse was head coach for the Norway men's national handball team from 1961 to 1965.

References

Year of birth missing (living people)
Living people
Norwegian male handball players
Norwegian handball coaches